Allahpur, Officially Bharadwaj Puram is a locality (township) of Allahabad, Uttar Pradesh, India.

Allahpur is a township/mohalla of Allahabad District. It falls under the Phulpur constituency of Uttar Pradhesh's legislative assembly.
It is located at a very strategic point in Allahabad with proximity to tourist attractions like Triveni Sangam (a confluence of the Ganges), the Yamuna, and the mythical Sarasvati River and Anand Bhavan.

Neighbourhoods in Allahabad